Gentefied is an American comedy-drama streaming television series created by Marvin Lemus and Linda Yvette Chávez, that premiered on Netflix on February 21, 2020. The series stars Karrie Martin, Joseph Julian Soria, Carlos Santos and Joaquín Cosío. In May 2020, the series was renewed for a second season which premiered on November 10, 2021. In January 2022, the series was canceled after two seasons.

Synopsis
Gentefied follows the story of "three Mexican-American cousins and their struggle to chase the American Dream, even while that same dream threatens the things they hold most dear: their neighborhood, their immigrant grandfather and the family taco shop".

Cast and characters

Main

 Joaquín Cosío as Casimiro "Pop" Morales, a widowed owner of "Mama Fina's". He and his wife Delfina ('Mama Fina') had three sons.
 J.J. Soria as Erik Morales, one of Pop's grandsons with a baby on the way. He's the son of one of Pop's sons.
 Karrie Martin Lachney as Ana Morales, one of Pop's granddaughters and an artist. She's the daughter of another one of Pop's sons.
 Carlos Santos as Chris Morales, one of Pop's grandsons and a chef. He's the son of another one of Pop's sons.

Recurring
 Julissa Calderon as Yessika Castillo, Ana's girlfriend who is a local activist
 Jaime Alvarez as Javier, a local musician
 Greg Ellis as Chef Austin, Chris' boss at "Mangia" who is also the executive chef
 Annie Gonzalez as Lidia Solis, Erik's pregnant highly educated girlfriend
 Bianca Melgar as Nayeli Morales, Ana's sister and another of Pop's granddaughters
 Laura Patalano as Beatriz Morales, Ana and Nayeli's mother who is a seamstress. Widow of one of Pop's sons.
 Rafael Sigler as Pancho Solis, Lidia's father
 Al Patiño as Chuey
 Brenda Banda as Norma, one of Pop's employees
 Felipe Esparza as Crazy Dave
 Michelle Ortiz as Connie
 Manuel Uriza as Ernesto Morales (season 2), Pop's estranged eldest son and Chris' father
 Melinna Bobadilla as Melinna Barragán (season 2), Pop's immigration lawyer who works for a non-profit organization
 Ivana Rojas as Saraí Damian (season 2), a chef and  Chris' love interest
 Clarissa Thibeaux as Bree Solano (season 2), a queer advertising executive who is recruiting Ana to work for Nike

Guest stars
 Van Jones as Himself (season 2)

Episodes

Series overview

Season 1 (2020)

Season 2 (2021)

Production

Development
On February 6, 2019, it was announced that Netflix had given the production a series order for a ten-episode first season. The series is created by Marvin Lemus and Linda Yvette Chávez who are credited as executive producers alongside Monica Macer, Aaliyah Williams, America Ferrera, Charles D. King, Kim Roth and Teri Weinberg. America Ferrera will also be directing two episodes of the series. MACRO, Take Fountain and Yellow Brick Road will be involved in the production of the series. The series was released on February 21, 2020. On May 18, 2020, Netflix renewed the series for an eight-episode second season. On November 23, 2020, it was announced that the series' executive producer Aaliyah Williams signed a deal with CBS Studios. The second season premiered on November 10, 2021. On January 13, 2022, Netflix canceled the series after two seasons.

Casting
In April 2019, it was announced that Karrie Martin, Joseph Julian Soria, Carlos Santos and Joaquín Cosío would star in the series. In May 2019, it was reported that Julissa Calderon, Annie Gonzalez, Laura Patalano, Felipe Esparza, Rafael Sigler, Jaime Alvarez, Bianca Melgar, Michelle Ortiz and Alejandro Patiño were cast in recurring roles. In April 2021, Clarissa Thibeaux, Manuel Uriza, Ivana Rojas, and Melinna Bobadilla joined the cast in recurring roles for the second season.

Gonzalez has a role in another show, Vida, which also explores the issue of gentrification in Boyle Heights. When NBC News reporter Ludwig Hurtado asked about the multiple shows on the same topic, Gonzalez said, "If we can have all these other procedurals of police shows and firefighters shows, we could have more shows like this. There's never enough.”

Reception

Critical response
On Rotten Tomatoes, the first season has an approval rating of 92% based on 24 reviews, with an average rating of 8/10. The website's critics consensus states, "If at times a bit blunt, Gentefieds gente-centric approach to the realities of gentrification is as strikingly personal as it is hilariously relatable." On Metacritic, it has a weighted average score of 70 out of 100, based on 11 critics, indicating "generally favorable reviews".

Writing for The New York Times, James Poniewozik thought the series was didactic at times, though positively, "The production feels connected to the place, sidewalk and soil. The show's voice is distinctive and assured, both figuratively and literally. It slips naturally among English and Spanish and Spanglish the same way its stories slip among worlds — from the Boyle Heights streets to the gallery world, from immigrant women sewing piecework to immigrant line cooks chiffonading herbs."

The second season holds a 100% approval rating on Rotten Tomatoes, based on 5 reviews, with an average rating of 8/10.

Accolades
Gentefied was nominated for the Outstanding Comedy Series category for the 33rd GLAAD Media Awards in 2022.

References

External links

2020 American television series debuts
2020s American comedy-drama television series
2020s American LGBT-related comedy television series
2020s American LGBT-related drama television series
2021 American television series endings
English-language Netflix original programming
Food and drink television series
Hispanic and Latino American television
Spanish-language Netflix original programming
Television shows set in Los Angeles
Works about gentrification